ICL cartridges (ICL stands for Increased Case Load) are rare hunting wildcat cartridges developed by Arnold & Vern Juenke, gunsmiths who owned Saturn Gun Works in Reno, Nevada.
ICL cartridges are wildcats based on conventional cases in use at the time. They feature a 45 degree shoulder and the sides are straightened out compared to the parent cartridge. Most of the cartridges are considered improved cartridges since they simply create more powder space while maintaining the same caliber as the parent cartridge. Most of the line of cartridges carries an animal name in addition to a numeric designation. It is one of the most complete lines of wildcats, having a large number of cartridges with a variety of calibers.

Quality Cartridge is the only manufacturer making new brass cases correctly headstamped for many ICL cartridges.

.22 caliber cartridges

.22 ICL Gopher
Based on an improved .22 Hornet, it is similar to the K-hornet.

.218 ICL Bobcat
Based on the .218 Bee. It's similar to the Mashburn Bee and the R-2 Lovell and can move a   bullet at

.224 ICL Benchrester
Based on the .250-3000 Savage case, with performance similar to a .219 Wasp.

.219 ICL Wolverine
Based on a .219 Zipper Improved, the Wolverine is useful for varmint hunting, such as woodchucks.

.224 ICL Marmot
The Marmot is based on the .220 Swift with improved characteristics such as steeper sides and shoulder angle, but is not improved in the sense that you cannot fire form factory ammunition in its chamber. P.O. Ackley noted that it is more efficient than standard .220 Swift improved cartridges, and not over-bore.

.24-.26 caliber cartridges

.25 ICL Magnum
The .25 ICL is a necked-down improved version of the .264 Winchester Magnum. It is similar to the .257 Weatherby.

.25-35 ICL Coyote
Based on the .25-35 Winchester and similar to the .25/35 Ackley Improved. Can also be made by necking-down .30-30. P.O. Ackley calls it "efficient and surprising".

.257 ICL Whitetail
The Whitetail is based on the .257 Roberts and is a standard improved cartridge.

.25-270 ICL Ram
The Ram is based on a .270 Winchester that is necked-down and blown-out. At the time it was considered an over-bore cartridge, before the advent of more appropriate slower-burning powder.

6.5 ICL Boar
The Boar is based on a .270 Winchester that is necked-down and blown-out.

6.5mm ICL Magnum
The 6.5 ICL is an improved .264 Winchester Magnum but with a longer neck for easier handloading.

.27-.28 caliber cartridges

.277 ICL Flying Saucer
The Flying Saucer is a necked-up blown-out .257 Roberts.

.270 ICL Magnum
The .270 ICL is an improved .264 Winchester Magnum necked up to .270. It's a relatively efficient cartridge for its class.

7mm ICL Magnum
The 7mm ICL is an improved .264 Winchester Magnum necked up to .7mm.

7mm ICL Tortilla
The Tortilla is an improved 7x57.

7mm ICL Wapiti
The Wapiti is a more complicated wildcat based on the .300 H&H Magnum being necked-down, trimmed, and then fire-formed. The large case is well-suited to heavy bullets.

.30 caliber cartridges

.300 ICL Tornado
The Tornado is based on a .257 Roberts case that is improved and necked to .30 caliber, essentially the same as the .277 ICL Flying Saucer, but necked-up.

.30/06 ICL Caribou
The Caribou is an improved .30-06. With heavy bullets it can reach the same level as factory loads for the .300 H&H Magnum.

.30 ICL Grizzly Cub
The Grizzly Cub is a shortened magnum for standard length actions. It's created by re-forming either a .338 Winchester Magnum or .308 Norma Magnum. P.O. Ackley favored short .30 caliber magnums and called it "highly recommended."

.300 ICL Grizzly

.300 ICL Grizzly' is based on the .300 H&H Magnum, and indeed the two are so similar that .300 H&H ammunition can safely be fired through a rifle chambered in .300 ICL Grizzly, as can the ammunition of another .300 H&H-based cartridge, the .300 Weatherby Magnum. The casings will fireform upon discharge.

.30 ICL Magnum
The .30 ICL is an improved .264 Winchester Magnum necked up to .270 and a pushed-back shoulder to create the steep angle common to all ICL cartridges and a long neck for improved handloading.

.300 ICL Magnum
The .300 ICL is an improved .300 H&H Magnum.

.303 ICL Improved
The .303 is an improved cartridge based on the .303 British and works well in Enfield and single-shot actions.

.37 caliber cartridges

.375 ICL Kodiak
The Kodiak is an improved cartridge based on the .375 H&H Magnum that is similar to the .375 Weatherby Magnum.

.375 ICL Magnum
The .375 ICL is an improved .375 H&H Magnum.

See also
List of rifle cartridges

References

Pistol and rifle cartridges
Magnum rifle cartridges
Cartridge families
Wildcat cartridges